Please Please Please is the debut studio album by the Famous Flames under the billing "James Brown and His Famous Flames", featuring the first album of recordings during Brown's long career. It includes the group's first two hit singles, the title track and "Try Me" (R&B #1, Pop #48), along with all the non-charting singles and b-sides he had recorded up to the time of the album's release. The album was reissued in 2003 by Polydor on a Japanese 24-bit remastered import CD packaged in a miniature LP sleeve.

Track listing

Personnel
Musicians
James Brown – lead vocals
The Famous Flames
Bobby Byrd – backing vocals, piano
Johnny Terry – backing vocals
Sylvester Keels – backing vocals
Bill Hollings – backing vocals
Louis Madison – backing vocals
Nafloyd Scott – guitar

Additional personnel
Clifford Scott – tenor saxophone
Kenny Burrell – guitar
Edwyn Conley – bass
George Dorsey – alto saxophone
John Faire – guitar
David "Panama" Francis – drums
Reginald Hall – drums
Ernie Hayes – piano
Clarence Mack – bass
Carl Pruitt – bass
Wilbert Smith – tenor saxophone
Ray Felder – tenor saxophone
Edison Gore – drums
Alvin "Fats" Gonder – piano
Eddie Freeman – guitar

References

James Brown albums
1958 debut albums
King Records (United States) albums
The Famous Flames albums
Albums produced by Ralph Bass